Hope Bridges Adams Lehmann (16 December 1855 – 10 October 1916) was the first female general practitioner and gynecologist in Munich, Germany.

She was the daughter of the English journalist and railway engineer William Bridges Adams.  She studied at Bedford College, London University, and then at the University of Leipzig before joining the medical register in Dublin in 1881.  She married fellow doctor Otto Walther in 1882.  They ran a medical practice together in Frankfurt am Main until 1886.  They had two children.

After she contracted tuberculosis, the couple opened a sanatorium, the Nordrach Clinic, in the Black Forest.  They ran the clinic together until 1893, and they were divorced in 1895.  She moved back to Munich and married Carl Lehmann in 1896.  Although she obtained her medical diploma in Germany in 1880, she was not acknowledged as a doctor or permitted to use the title until 1904.

Works
 Das Frauenbuch. Ein ärztlicher Ratgeber für die Frau in der Familie und bei Frauenkrankheiten. Bd. 1: Körperbau und Gesundheitspflege, Bd. 2: Krankenpflege. Süddeutsches Verlags-Institut, Stuttgart 1896
 Die Gesundheit im Haus Adams-Lehmann, Hope Bridges. - Stuttgart: Süddeut. Verl.-Inst., 1899
 Die Arbeit der Frau. In Zepler, Wally (1919). Sozialismus und Frauenfrage, Berlin, Bruno Cassirer, pp.46-55

Further reading
 Dewi, Torsten; Tempel, Katrin (2009). Dr. Hope. Eine Frau gibt nicht auf. Deutschlands erste Ärztin. Piper, München/Zürich. ISBN 978-3-492-25488-5
 Eckart, W. U. et al.; eds. (2006): Ärzte Lexikon. 3. Auflage. Springer Verlag, Heidelberg, ISBN 3-540-29584-4
 Kirschstein, Christine (1992). Fortgesetzte Verbrechen wider das Leben. Ursachen und Hintergründe des 1914 nach § 219 RSTGB eingeleiteten Untersuchungsverfahren gegen die Münchener Ärztin Dr. Hope Bridges Adams-Lehmann. Haag + Herchen Frankfurt am Main, ISBN 3-89228-871-2
 Krauss, Marita (2002). Die Lebensentwürfe und Reformvorschläge der Ärztin Hope Bridge Adams Lehmann (1851–1916). In: E. Dickmann, E. Schöck-Quinteros (Hrsg.): Barrieren und Karrieren. Die Anfänge des Frauenstudiums in Deutschland. Dokumentationsband der Konferenz „100 Jahre Frauen in der Wissenschaft“ im Februar 1997 an der Universität Bremen, Nr. 5. trafo verlag, Berlin, ISBN 3-89626-178-9, pp. 143–157
 Sigusch, Volkmar; Grau, Günter, eds. (2009): Adams-Lehmann, Hope Bridges. In: Personenlexikon der Sexualforschung. Campus, Frankfurt am Main 2009. ISBN 978-3-593-39049-9. pp. 23-
 Usborne, Cornelie (2007). Cultures of abortion in Weimar Germany. ,

External links
  "Dr Hope (2009)" at IMDb.

1855 births
1916 deaths
German gynaecologists
German abortion providers
German women physicians
19th-century German physicians
20th-century German physicians
Alumni of Bedford College, London
20th-century women physicians
19th-century women physicians
20th-century German women